Áed Ua hOissín (Hugh O'Hession) was consecrated first Archbishop of Tuam in 1152 and died in 1161. He was closely associated with Connacht royalty, and had served as abbot of Tuam.

Biography

Ua hOissín was the first Archbishop of Tuam and one of four bishops granted pallia at the Synod of Kells by the papal legate Cardinal Archbishop Giovanni Paparoni in 1152. He played a part in the period of Cistercian-inspired church reform initiated by St Malachy immediately before the Norman invasion of Ireland.

He came from a family with some church connections: Aed Ua Oisin was also the name of a coarb of Iarlaith of Tuam (abbot of Jarlath's Monastery) in the late 11th century – this abbot is said to have died in 1085. With other clergy he actively intervened in the affairs of Connaught and Ireland more broadly, and though Connaught wasn't a centre of Cistercian inspired reform he was part of a renewal of the Church centred on the refoundation of Tuam by Tairrdelbach Ua Conchobair in 1128. He was both preceded and succeeded as chief Bishop of Connacht by members of the prominent ecclesiastical family of Ó Dubhthaigh. O hOisins or Hession's still live in and around Tuam today.

Politics

Ua Oisin was closely connected with kings Toirdelbach Ua Conchobair and Ruaidrí Ua Conchobair, Kings of Connaught and High Kings of Ireland. He is associated, as Abbot of Tuam (and therefore prior to his accession), with a spectacular High Cross in Tuam, which honours King Toirdelbach. The High Cross  is inscribed with the messageHe is probably one of the few 12th century Irishmen whose image survives on a monument. See Petrie

Abbot of Tuam/Coarb of Iarlaith

It's unclear when Áed first became Abbot of Tuam, but it's clear his predecessor Muirgius ua Nioc, superior of Tuaim dá Gualann, died in Inis in Ghaill (Inchagoill) on Loch Corrib in 1128. Áed had probably succeeded by that time and is therefore probably the successor of St Jarlath who took part in the refoundation of Tuam with Toirdhealbhach Ó Conchobhair the same year, and referred to in the Annals of Tighernach

In 1134 as Abbot of Tuam, the Annals of Innisfallen and Annals of Tighernach record that he was sent by Toirdelbach with Muireadhach Ua Dubhthaigh then Bishop to make peace with Munster following a raid on Tuam by the O'Briens and their allies..

As part of these negotiations the Abbey of St Finbarr of Cork was re-established with a church for Connaught Pilgrims, and Gilla Áedha Ua Maigín as Abbot. St Finbarr himself was the son of Amergin of Maigh Seóla near Tuam, and according to Mac Carthaigh's Book, Gilla Aedha (named for Aedh Ua Oisin), who was also present at the Synod of Kells, died in 1173.

In 1135, according to the Annals of the Four Masters, he became a guarantor for Toirdhealbhach's son Ruaidrí Ua Conchobair (the last High King of Ireland), who Toirdhealbhach had taken hostage.

In 1143 Ua Oisin was again a guarantor with Ua Dubthaig of Ruaidrí Ua Conchobair, and protested his arrest at a Synod of 12 Bishops and 500 priests, though Ruaidri was only released in 1144. This same year he also took part in a peace conference between Ua Conchobair and Ua Brian at Tir da Ghlas.

Archbishop of Tuam

During the first half of the 12th century, the post of Archbishop/Bishop of Connacht had been held by Ua hOissin's predecessors –  Cathasach Ua Conaill (died 1117), Domhnall Ua Dubhthaigh (1117-1136), Muireadhach Ua Dubhthaigh (1136-1150). His investiture as Archbishop in 1152 was the culmination of a long negotiation by St Malachy of Armagh to secure reform of the Irish Church and settle the appointment of metropolitans by the pope, Eugenius III. St Malachy died in 1148 on his mission to secure the palia – in the arms of St Bernard of Clairvaux.

Initially, the papal legate Giovanni Paparoni was refused passage to Ireland by King Stephen of England in 1150, probably to protect Canterbury's traditional claim over Dublin. But he returned in 1151, with Christian Ua Conairce, a Cistercian colleague of the Pope, who became the first Abbot of Mellifont, Bishop of Lismore, and the next papal legate. He was given safe passage by King David I of Scotland and spent some months in Ireland, at Armagh and elsewhere confirming the settlement before convening the Synod of Kells at Kells and subsequently near Drogheda at Mellifont. Aubrey Gwynn concludes that Ua Oisin was not a Bishop immediately prior to his investiture as the first Archbishop of Tuam and of Connacht. As a result, he is not named but was rather one of the five candidate bishops mentioned at Kells, and received his pallium as Archbishop later at Mellifont on Palm Sunday.

In 1156, and after King Toirdelbach's death, he was prevented from joining a Synod called by the Ua Mael Sechlainn Kings of Mide by representatives of the king. At this Synod the successor of Colum-Cille head of the Columban Churches, Flaithbheartach Ua Brolchain, was given episcopal status. A Synod of Connaught for clergy was held in Roscommon instead.

According to the Annals of Ulster these were agents of Ua Mael Sechlainn.

But, also according to the Annals of Ulster, he returned to Mellifont where he received his Pall for its consecration in 1157.

Death

Hession died in 1161 and was succeeded by Cadla Ua Dubthaig. Hession was considered sufficiently deserving to be buried in a magnificent marble tomb that survived until the mid-16th century. A new street has recently been named in his honour in Tuam.

Notes

References

1161 deaths
12th-century Roman Catholic bishops in Ireland
Archbishops of Tuam
Medieval Gaels from Ireland
Year of birth unknown